Chalcosyrphus (Xylotomima) nigromaculatus  (Jones, 1917), the Black-spotted Leafwalker, is a rare species of syrphid fly observed in Colorado, British Columbia, Oregon  and Utah. Hoverflies can remain nearly motionless while in flight. The adults are also known as flower flies for they are commonly found on flowers, from which they get both energy-giving nectar and protein-rich pollen.

Distribution
Canada, United States.

References

Eristalinae
Insects described in 1917
Diptera of North America
Hoverflies of North America